Siphonophoridae is a family of millipede in the order Siphonophorida. There are about 12 genera and more than 110 described species in Siphonophoridae.

Genera
These 12 genera belong to the family Siphonophoridae:

 Bactrois Cook, 1896
 Balizonium Verhoeff, 1941
 Columbianum Verhoeff, 1941
 Gonatotrichus Attems, 1951
 Linozonium Attems, 1951
 Lomboknium Verhoeff, 1941
 Okeanozonium Verhoeff, 1941
 Pterozonium Attems, 1951
 Rhinosiphora Verhoeff, 1924
 Siphonacme Cook & Loomis, 1928
 Siphonocybe Pocock, 1903
 Siphonophora Brandt, 1837

References

Further reading

 
 
 
 

Siphonophorida
Millipedes of North America
Articles created by Qbugbot
Millipede families